François de Closets (born 25 December 1933) is a French journalist and television presenter.

Reference

1933 births
Living people
French male journalists
French television presenters
People from Enghien-les-Bains
Sciences Po alumni
Science communicators
20th-century French journalists
20th-century French non-fiction writers